The Peachtree Road Race (branded AJC Peachtree Road Race for sponsorship reasons) is an American 10-kilometer run held annually in Atlanta.  After being held on Independence Day from 1970 to 2019, the race was cancelled because of the COVID pandemic after originally being set for Thanksgiving. It is the world's largest 10k race, a title it has held since the late 1970s. The race has become a citywide tradition in which over 70,000 amateur and professional runners try to register for one of the limited 60,000 spots. The event also includes a wheelchair race (known as the Shepherd Center wheelchair division), which precedes the footrace. In recent years, the race also has a special division for soldiers stationed in the Middle East. The race attracts some of the world's elite 10K runners and has served as both the United States' men's and women's 10K championship.

Children can participate in the Peachtree Junior 1 mile run or 50m Dash, held on July 3 in Piedmont Park.

History 

The AJC Peachtree Road Race was started in 1970 by the Atlanta Track Club. The first year, 110 runners ran from the old Sears building at the corner of Peachtree Street and Roswell Road to Central City Park (now Woodruff Park). The race was sponsored by Carling Brewery. The next year, the race increased to 198 runners. Organizers used the sponsorship money to purchase T-shirts but underestimated the number of participants. T-shirts were given out to the first finishers, until they ran out. In 1972, the organizers ordered only 250 T-shirts but 330 runners ran the race. In 1974, the event grew to 765 runners; in 1975 there were over 1,000 runners.

In 1976, Carling Brewery dropped its sponsorship of the race and The Atlanta Journal-Constitution began sponsoring the race, bringing it added coverage and popularity. That year over 2,300 runners competed. In 1977 over 6,500 runners competed, overwhelming the capacity of Central City Park. As a result, in 1978 the course was moved to starting at Lenox Square and finishing at Piedmont Park. In 1979 the race attracted over 20,000 runners. In 1980, the number of participants was limited to 25,000 runners, which continued until 1990. In 1982, the Shepherd Center wheelchair division was formed for the race.

The race became so popular that by 1989, the race reached capacity in only nine days and Atlanta Track Club increased the limit to 40,000 in 1990. In 1992, it expanded to 45,000 runners; in 1995, it expanded to 50,000 runners, followed by a 10% expansion in 1998 to 55,000 runners; it would not be until 2011 that the capacity was expanded to 60,000.

The AJC Peachtree Road Race has become an event important in Atlanta culture. In addition to the 60,000 participants, there are approximately 150,000 observers who line both sides of the entire course to cheer and support the runners.  Some runners deliberately wear costumes, many of which are patriotic (due to the event's occurring on Independence Day). The entire race is also televised on WXIA-TV.

The race hosted the USA Men's 10 km Championship in 2007.

2008 changes 
With the entire north Georgia region facing historic drought conditions in 2008, water conservation measures were enacted prohibiting outdoor watering of plants and lawns. As a result of the watering ban, the City of Atlanta decided to prohibit large festivals (over 50,000 people) from using Piedmont Park in 2008 in order to protect the grass lawns which could not be watered. Displaced events included the Atlanta Pride, Jazz, and Dogwood Festivals as well as the Peachtree Road Race which traditionally used Piedmont Park for the finish line of the race and distribution of T-shirts.  The AJC Peachtree Road Race considered moving the finish area to Georgia Tech, but Georgia Tech refused, citing safety concerns.  On February 19, it was announced that the race finish line would be at the intersection of Juniper Street and Ponce de Leon Avenue in Midtown. Runners then walked three more blocks to the Atlanta Civic Center parking area where the awards stage, family meeting area and sponsor village were located. The race returned to its previous course in 2009.

2009 changes 
Starting in 2009, and in association with Atlanta Track Club, registration applications began to be accepted online on the Active.com site starting on the third Sunday in March.  Controversy ruled over the 2009 registration, as over 800 complaints were filed because of server failures by the outsourced registration.  The 45,000 applications sold out within hours.

The following Sunday, applications for the 10,000 slot lottery are published in The Atlanta Journal-Constitution. These slots are randomly selected from remaining applications post-marked by March 31.

Atlanta Track Club experimented in November 2008 at The Weather Channel Atlanta Marathon and Half Marathon with implementation of the ChronoTrack D-Tag transponder system, a disposable tag system.  Following its success, the organization announced that starting with the 2009 Peachtree, all runners—not just the elite and timegroup 1 runners—will be timed. Doing this will help with positioning runners for future Peachtree events.

2010 changes 
Online registration for the 2010 PRR opened on Sunday, March 21, at 1:00 pm.  The first 45,000 online applicants receive race entry.  Additionally, a paper application appeared in the March 28 AJC.  10,000 entries were to be randomly selected from all paper applications received. The online spots were filled in less than five hours.

In one of the biggest changes seen in race history, starting assignments for all participants will be performance-based.  Once the top-seeded and sub-seeded runners start, timegroups 1A, 1B, and 2-9 have been replaced with start waves A-W (19 in total, with letters I, O, Q and V omitted). Applicants are able to submit results from an official race (run on a USATF-certified course), run on or after March 1, 2008, of distances of 5 miles, 10K, 10 miles, the 1/2 marathon, and for the first time, the shorter 5K distance.

2011 changes 
Atlanta Track Club switched to an exclusive lottery format online for the 2011 Peachtree.  Most of the 60,000 positions were determined by a lottery draw, with selected exceptions for elite invited athletes, the members of the organizing club, and those who have run ten or more consecutive Peachtree Road Races, all of which were allowed automatic entry.  Also, those who pay $150 for the organizers' charity would be automatically entered.

2020 cancellation 
The March 15 opening of lottery and Atlanta Track Club member registration occurred just four days after the Rudy Gobert COVID-19 positive test at an NBA game that caused a shutdown of sport in the United States.  The resulting lottery and club member registration only drew 45,000 entries, with the race only was three-fourths full by the traditional lottery deadline of March 31.  Atlanta Track Club cancelled the drawing, awarding all 45,000 entries an automatic entry into the Peachtree.

On May 1, 2020, the Atlanta Track Club announced the cancellation of the Invesco QQQ Half Marathon usually held on Thanksgiving Day and will instead hold the Peachtree on November 26, 2020, a byproduct of the coronavirus pandemic.  A second round of member registration will be held in September, followed by registration to fill out the field later in the month, for the November date.

The race was officially cancelled in August 2020, which the Atlanta Track Club used to move two other races that were to be part of the Triple Peach outside Fulton County, which was under restrictions imposed by the county, and into closed-course motor racing circuits (which are private property) outside the county.  The PNC 10 Miler in October moved to Michelin Raceway in Hall County and the 2021 Atlanta Marathon was relocated to the perimeter roads and parking lots surrounding, and finishing with laps inside, Atlanta Motor Speedway in Henry County.

51st Peachtree:  July 3–4, 2021 
The Atlanta Track Club announced in January 2021 that the 51st Peachtree Road Race would be held July 3–4, 2021, with runners being assigned to either the July 3 or July 4 wave.  The two-day event was held on its traditional course.

Qualification

Qualifying events
The Peachtree Road Race has a list of regional races that serve as qualifiers for the race.

January
 Resolution Run 4 Miler
 Braselton Lifeway 8K/5K
 MLK Day 5k Drum Run
 Peachtree City 8K/15K
 Norcross High School Blue Devils Run
 Dr. James H. Crowdis Run 5K/10K
 Milton Boys Lacrosse 5K
 Cool Shark 5K
 The Frozen 5K 
 First Watch Locomotive Half Marathon/5K
 East Metro Atlanta 5K
February
 Atlanta Hawks Fast Break 5K
 PT Solutions Cupid Chase 5K
 Run For Angels 5K/10K
 Suwanee Half Marathon
 Tartan Trot 5K/10K
 Hearts & Soles 5K
 Southsides Fastest 5k
 The With or Without You 5K
 Atlanta Mission 5k Race to End Homelessness
 Wiphan Warthog Waddle
 Love Run 5K sponsored by DeKalb DA Sherry Boston
 Augusta University Half Marathon, 10K, & 5K
 Run for the Son
 Love in Action 5K
March
 Awesomesauce 5K and 1 Mile Fun Run
 Chattahoochee Road Race 10K & 5K
 Dental Dash at Dawn 5k
 Finish Lion 5K
 Run Dahlonega 5K
 Berry Half Marathon/10k/5k
 Shamrock 'N Roll Road Race
 Marietta Shamrock Shuffle 5k
 Gwinnett Life Run 5K
 Water Drop Dash 5k
 Publix Georgia Marathon & Half Marathon
 Atlanta Women's 5K
 Cass Cannonball 5K/10K
 Refuge Run 5K/10K
 Brookhaven Cherry Blossom Festival 5K
 Run For Ronald 5K
 Chasing Moonlight/Racing Sunlight, the Tropical Smoothie Cafe 5K in Paradise
 The Lucky Leprechaun 5K
 Junior League of Macon Road Race
April
 The Daffodil Dash
 Singleton 5K/10K
 Pace Race 5K
 Dallas Race for a Cure
 Annual Sickle Cell Road Race
 The Fantastic Movie Run 10K
 Tropical Smoothie Cafe 5K
May
 Hustle for Hope 5K Run 
 Swift Cantrell Classic 5k
 Brookhaven Bolt
 Fast Track 5k
 Project 82 Kenya 5K
June
 Turbo Dash 10K
 Braves Country 5K/10K
 Odyssey 5K Run
 Dream Dash 5K
 Healthy Heart 5K
 Run with the Badges 5K Glow Run
July
 AJC Peachtree Road Race
 The Sports Fanatic 5k
 Decatur Dekalb 4 Miler
 Leadership Butts Glow Run
 Hi-Tech Race Series 5K
August
 Hero Run 5k
 Tailgate 5K Presented by Georgia's Own Credit 
 Atlanta's Finest 5K
 The ATL 10K
 Walk, Wag, N' Run 5K
September
 Big Peach Sizzler 10K
 The Birchmore Memorial Run for Fun 5K
 Team Maggie 5K/10K
 ADMH Run for Health
 Wingfoot XC Classic
 Great Locomotive Chase 5k
 Mercedes-Benz Stadium 5K/Walk Like MADD
 Superhero 5K Run Walk
 Race to End Violence
October
 Duluth Donut Dash 5K
 Lily's Run and Family Festival 5K
 Cobb County 5K to benefit Make-A-Wish Georgia
 JE Dunn Hammer Down 5k
 Annual Run Your Tail Off 5K
 PNC Atlanta 10 Miler & 5K
 2017 Gin Run 5K
 Racin' in the 'Burg 5K
 17th Annual Jack O'Lantern Jog 5K
 Officer's Down 5K - DeKalb County Police Department
 Big Pumpkin Run 5K
 Garden Gallop 5K
 Angel Dash 5K
 Cupcake RUN! ATL 5K
 Spooktacular Chase 10K & 5K
 CLIF Craft Coffee Fest 5K
 Winship Win the Fight 5K
November
 Starry Night 5K
 Holiday Haulin' 5K and Fun Run
 Stuff the Bus 5K Run/Walk
 Race for Grace Half Marathon
 Smyrna Village 5K & 10K
 Thanksgiving Day Half Marathon & 5K
 Jefferson First Baptist Church 9th Annual 5K Turkey Can Run/Walk
 St. Peter Chanel 5K
 30A 10K

Race registration and starting group placement 

Until 2008, applications for registration in the AJC Peachtree Road Race were published in The Atlanta Journal-Constitution on the third Sunday in March. The first 45,000 applications received were automatically entered into the race; an additional 10,000 applications are randomly selected from remaining applications post-marked by March 31. The race is currently limited to 60,000 entries. The 2009 registration fee was $33.  Atlanta Track Club requires runners to be at least 10 years of age by the day of the race.

The race is divided into 21 starting groups, all based on times verified at USA Track and Field certified courses with the past two years at distances between 5 km and 21.1 km (half marathon) races that the runner must submit to the Atlanta Track Club at time of registration in March. The last groups (W, X, and Y) will be assigned to runners who did not send a verified time from a USATF-certified course.  Seeded runners, invited athletes, and the first group (Group A) start at 7:30 AM, while groups are launched at intervals of between four and six minutes each, with the last group (Group Y) starting at 9:05 AM.

Due to the limited number of spaces available in the race, as well as the three and a half month advance registration requirement, some people have attempted to sell their number on eBay and craigslist, although this practice is prohibited by Atlanta Track Club. Runners who are assigned a number for the race, and subsequently cannot run, are able to return their number to Atlanta Track Club in exchange for a card guaranteeing placement in next year's race. (Registration fees, however, are not refunded.)

On July 4, 2007, three men were caught sneaking in to the AJC Peachtree Road Race. In addition to a $1,000 fine, each was banned from the AJC Peachtree Road Race for life.

Course description 
The AJC Peachtree Road Race is a 10,000-meter road race. The race starts on Peachtree Road at Lenox Square Mall (just south of Lenox Road). The race continues down Peachtree into midtown Atlanta, turning left onto 10th Street for the final kilometer before ending at 10th St. and Charles Allen Drive. Piedmont Park provides the setting for post-race festivities that include a stage for live performances and an awards ceremony. After a largely downhill first half, runners cross Peachtree Creek and tackle the grueling 3/4 mile-long "Cardiac Hill," which culminates at Peachtree and Collier Rd. in front of Piedmont Hospital. Mile 5 has been known as the Olympic Mile, where banners and theme music entertained IOC members in 1990 during Atlanta's bid for the 1996 Summer Olympics.

In 2008, because of severe drought conditions, the race was unable to end in Piedmont Park, and runners turned east onto 10th Street before heading to Juniper Street, ending at the intersection of Ponce de Leon and Juniper St, where racers finished by going uphill instead of the older downhill stretch of 10th St.  Runners then walked a short distance to the Atlanta Civic Center for finish-line festivities. This unpopular course lasted one year, after which the course returned to the traditional pattern.

As typical of other road races, the roads used are completely closed to vehicular traffic and observers watch from the sidewalks. Water is provided at each mile; approximately 500,000 cups and 120,000 gallons of water are used.  Approximately 3,000 volunteers are needed to work the race.

Due to the large crowds, limited parking and road closures, many runners utilize MARTA to travel to the start site and back from the finish line.

Official starters 
University of Georgia track and field coach Spec Towns shot the starter pistol to start the first Peachtree Road Race in 1970.  Georgia Governor Jimmy Carter started the second race and Georgia Lt. Governor Lester Maddox the third. Since then, many notable people—including politicians, sportswriters, and an entertainer—have started the race.

Original 110 
The 110 runners who finished the first Peachtree Road Race are known as the "Original 110". As of July 4, 2022, Bill Thorn Sr. is the only runner to finish every Peachtree Road Race.

T-shirts 

The official race T-shirt is perhaps the most popular aspect of the AJC Peachtree Road Race, perhaps due to the limited numbers of T-shirts available in the early race years. Each year a different design is chosen through a contest sponsored by The Atlanta Journal-Constitution newspaper and a limited number of shirts are made. T-shirts are available to only those runners who finish the race, and thus have become a status-symbol among Atlanta culture.

Race financials 
It is estimated that the AJC Peachtree Road Race costs over $1,000,000, if in-kind contributions are included.  The race must pay between $25,000 and $30,000 to government agencies for their costs of supporting the race. T-shirts for runners and volunteers are estimated to cost over $200,000. The race also pays $25,000 for its timing system and $100,000 for contract labor.  The AJC Peachtree Road Race was estimated in 2003 to have an economic impact over $10,000,000.  Profits from the race entry fees and sponsorships are used to fund the Atlanta Track Club.

Events

Race competitions

Kilometer Kids Charity Chase 
First held during the 2014 race, the annual Kilometer Kids Charity Chase  features six teams representing each branch of the military: Air Force, Army, Coast Guard, Marine Corps, National Guard and the Navy. Each team will have six runners each, all competing for bragging rights in two areas: the fastest military branch, and the team that receives the most donations for Atlanta Track Club's Kilometer Kids youth running program.

The military competition takes place after the Shepherd Center Wheelchair Division of the AJC Peachtree Road Race, and before the Peachtree Cup elite competition and general race waves begin.

The online portion of the fundraiser allows supporters to select a military team at the time of donation. All proceeds go towards the Atlanta Track Club's Kilometer Kids youth program. Starting in 2015, a portion of the donations are to go towards starting a Kilometer Kids program at Fort Benning, the first one to be established on a military base.

Peachtree Cup 

The Peachtree Cup is an elite team competition which had its inaugural at the 2015 Peachtree Road Race. The competition takes place after the Kilometer Kids Charity Chase and before the general race waves began their run. The Peachtree Cup features four entries: Team USA, Team Africa, Team Asia, and Team Europe.  The roster of each team consist of six athletes, three men and three women vying for international bragging rights. One member of each team is selected as the team captain. The determining of the winning team consists of combining each of the team members’ individual finish times together and the team with the fastest cumulative time is the winner. The team that comes in first place will receive the first-place prize of $42,000 US.

Race series

Triple Peach Race Series 

The Atlanta Track Club Triple Peach Race Series presented by Mizuno, a program designed to improve the Atlanta running experience, features three of Atlanta's top running events: AJC Peachtree Road Race, Atlanta 10-Miler (in October) and the Thanksgiving Day Half Marathon (Thanksgiving Day) (all races that were part of the original Atlanta Marathon). The annual race series was started in 2013 by the Atlanta Track Club and partner sponsor Volkswagen Group of America. It was originally called the VW Triple Peach, but Volkswagen of America dropped its sponsorship of the race after only the first year, resulting in the race series' being renamed the Atlanta Track Club Triple Peach Race Series the following year, 2014.  In 2015, Mizuno Corporation become the new program sponsor.

The Triple Peach is limited to 4,000 participants.  Registration includes one low price for the Atlanta 10-Miler and the Thanksgiving Day Half Marathon. All participants receive a Triple Peach finisher's medal and Triple Peach finisher's T-shirt. The program also uses unique bibs that allow participants the opportunity to self-seed in the start corrals at both the Atlanta 10-Miler and the Thanksgiving Day Half Marathon. Upon finishing the Thanksgiving Day Half Marathon, Triple Peach participants meet at a special celebration area to be officially recognized and to fine-tune the program for the coming year.

The 2020 Triple Peach was cancelled as a result of the pandemic;  however, the other two races were held, the Michelin Raceway Atlanta 10-Miler and the Atlanta Motor Speedway Publix Half Marathon in February 2021 were still held.

Wheelchair division 

Founded in 1982 by the Shepherd Center, the Shepherd Center Wheelchair Division of AJC Peachtree Road Race precedes the foot race, starting at 6:45 am. The wheelchair division follows the same 10-kilometer course run by the foot runners down Peachtree Road, starting at Lenox Road and ending on 10th Street at Piedmont Park in Midtown. Since its 1981 founding, the wheelchair division has grown in popularity so that the race now attracts more than 78 wheelchair racers ranging in age from 16 to 69 and representing more than nine countries. Today, the Shepherd Center Wheelchair Division of AJC Peachtree Road Race is considered one of the largest and fastest wheelchair 10K races in the country and is a favorite for many racers who return year after year.

Wheelchair race divisions 
The Shepherd Center and its Junior Committee fund and organize the wheelchair division race in cooperation with the Atlanta Track Club. Funding provides pre-and post-race brunches, defrayed travel and lodging expenses for racers and a $34,000 purse for winners. The Shepherd Center Wheelchair Division of AJC Peachtree Road Race racing divisions are as follows:
Open Men’s Division
Open Women’s Division
Open Quad Division (some upper-body paralysis)
T-1 Quad Division (more paralysis with limited hand function)
Masters Division (ages 40 to 50)
Junior Division (ages 12 to 21)
Grand Masters (ages 50 and over)
Push-Assist Division - Trials 2014 and 2015, officially added as a division in 2016.

Overseas races 

Since 2004, satellite Peachtree Races have been held for US soldiers stationed overseas. The first race was held in Iraq. In 2007, five separate races were held on July 4 (one in Kuwait, three in Iraq, and one in Afghanistan) with a combined total of 3000 participants.  The Atlanta Track Club sends race supplies, including T-shirts, to the runners.

Peachtree Junior 

Started in 1987, The Peachtree Junior consists of three races: 
3 kilometer (1.9 mi) race open to children ages 7 to 14
  for ages 5–9
Lil' Peach, a  Dash race for ages 6 & younger
Starting in 2015, ten Kid-Friendly Decathlon events were added to the Peachtree Junior. The decatlon events take place upon completion of the each of the three Peachtree Junior races and are open to participants ages fourteen and under.

3K or 1/2K
40yd dash
High jump
Shot put
Long jump
Discus
Turbo javelin
Hurdles
Standing broad jump
Shuttle relay

The race is designed to be a shorter and safer version of the longer Peachtree Road Race. All race participants get the opportunity to take part in the Peachtree Jr. Challenge, which awards scholarships to the top three organizations that sign up the most kids. The event is held in late May or early June. The entire course is within the confines of Piedmont Park. The race is limited to 2,500 participants. T-shirts are given to all race finishers. The event has been held for over 20 years.

Peachtree Jr. course and date changes 
For the First time ever in Peachtree Jr. history and in correlation with the 50th running of the Peachtree Road Race, 2019, the Atlanta Track Club decided to move the Peachtree Jr. permanently to July 3 as part of the Peachtree Road Race experience.

As part of the move to July 3, the course was changed to include for the first time a portion of the official Peachtree Road Race 10K course thus leaving the confines within Piedmont Park for the first time as well. The start of the course would be located at the corner of Charles Allen Drive and Piedmont Park Avenue next to the south portion of Lake Clara Meer within the Piedmont Park boundary.  Runners would head west on Piedmont Park Avenue still inside Piedmont Park until they reached 12th Street Gate leaving the park. Portions of the Peachtree Road Race 10K course used for the Peachtree Jr. would be the south portion of Piedmont Avenue from the 12th Street Gate and the 10th Street portion that includes the same finish on 10th Street as the 10K .

Past winners 

The men's course record is 27:01 minutes, set by Rhonex Kipruto in 2019. Lornah Kiplagat is the women's record holder with her run of 30:32 from 2002. The record for the wheelchair division of the Peachtree Road Race is 18:38:06 (Saul Mendoza) 2004.  The women's division record is 22:09:97 (Edith Hunkler) 2009. Gayle Barron and Lornah Kiplagat are the athletes with the most victories in the history of the Peachtree Road Race. Barron won in the women's division on five occasions (1970–71, 1973–75), while Kiplagat had her victories from 2000–2002 and 2005–2006.

Key:

Past wheelchair division winners

Key:

Past Peachtree Cup winners

Key:

References

External links

Official AJC Peachtree Road Race Site
Runpeachtree.com - for runners of the Peachtree Road Race
Title sponsor of The AJC Peachtree Road Race - The Atlanta Journal-Constitution

Sports competitions in Atlanta
10K runs
Independence Day (United States)
Recurring sporting events established in 1970
Tourist attractions in Atlanta
1970 establishments in Georgia (U.S. state)